Cyamops femoratus is a species of fly.

References

femoratus
Insects described in 2000